Saint John's Church — Azerbaijan's first German Lutheran church located in Helenendorf.

History
It all began when several hundred families of Swabian Lutheran pietists arrived in Russian Empire with the permission of Emperor Alexander I in 1817. Nearly 700 Swabian families were resettled in Transcaucasia, where almost 120 of them founded the colony of Helenendorf,. 
Over time, a German Lutheran community appeared there along with the need for building a place of worship. First stone for the church laid  next to a parish school in 24 April 1854. Church was consecrated and opened to public in 10 March 1857. Its first pastor was Georg Heinrich Reitenbach (1832-1840). The church has an Organ (music) manufactured by a famous Ludwigsburg company “E. F. Walcker & Cie.” installed inside. The last confirmation ceremony with the participation of 85 teenagers took place in the church in 1934. Between 1936 and 1938 the pastors of all the German colonies were arrested; the church bells were taken down, the altar was destroyed, and the organ was taken apart. The church was closed after the deportation of the Germans from the region in 1941. At different times, the building served as a sports hall and a military hospital.

Today
In 2008, the St. John’s Church was renovated with the financial support of the German GIZ. The tower was supplied with a clock and bells thanks to fundraising efforts of the “EuroKaukAsia”, a cultural and scientific society. Since 2009 the church houses the History-ethnography museum of Goygol.

See also 
 Germany–Azerbaijan relations

References 

Churches in Azerbaijan
Lutheran churches in Azerbaijan
Gothic Revival architecture in Azerbaijan